Bearpaw Lake is located in Grand Teton National Park, in the U. S. state of Wyoming. Bearpaw Lake is south of Trapper Lake and north of Leigh Lake. Bearpaw Lake is an easy to moderate  (to Trapper Lake, which is somewhat further) round trip hike along the Leigh Lake Trail. The trail starts at the String Lake trailhead and wanders north along the east shores of Leigh Lake with a  elevation gain. Bearpaw Lake is nestled at the eastern base of Mount Moran and snow and glacier meltwaters off Skillet Glacier eventually feed into the lake. There are three backcountry camping sites with designated tent pads at the lake and a backcountry permit is required to use these sites.

References

Lakes of Grand Teton National Park